The 23rd Hollywood Film Awards were held on November 3, 2019. The ceremony took place at The Beverly Hilton in Beverly Hills, California and was hosted by Rob Riggle.

Winners
Hollywood Career Achievement Award Charlize Theron
Hollywood Actor Award Antonio Banderas – Pain and Glory
Hollywood Actress Award Renée Zellweger – Judy
Hollywood Supporting Actor Award Al Pacino – The Irishman
Hollywood Supporting Actress Award Laura Dern – Marriage Story
Hollywood Breakout Actor Award Taron Egerton – Rocketman
Hollywood Breakout Actress Award Cynthia Erivo – Harriet
Hollywood Filmmaker Award Bong Joon-ho – Parasite
Hollywood Director Award James Mangold – Ford v Ferrari
Hollywood Producer Award Emma Tillinger Koskoff – The Irishman
Hollywood Screenwriter Award Anthony McCarten – The Two Popes
Hollywood Breakthrough Director Award Olivia Wilde – Booksmart
Hollywood Breakthrough Screenwriter Award Shia LaBeouf – Honey Boy
Hollywood Animation Award Toy Story 4
Hollywood Blockbuster Award Kevin Feige and Victoria Alonso – Avengers: Endgame
Hollywood Cinematography Award Mihai Mălaimare Jr. – Jojo Rabbit
Hollywood Costume Design Award Anna Mary Scott Robbins – Downton Abbey
Hollywood Editor Award Michael McCusker and Andrew Buckland – Ford v Ferrari
Hollywood Film Composer Award Randy Newman – Marriage Story
Hollywood Make-Up & Hair Styling Award Lizzie Yianni-Georgiou, Tapio Salmi, and Barrie Gower – Rocketman
Hollywood Production Design Award Ra Vincent – Jojo Rabbit
Hollywood Song Award Pharrell Williams – "Letter to My Godfather" from The Black Godfather
Hollywood Sound Award Donald Sylvester, Paul Massey, David Giammarco, and Steven A. Morrow – Ford v Ferrari
Hollywood Visual Effects Award Pablo Helman – The Irishman

References

External links
 

Hollywood
2019 in California
Hollywood Film Awards
2019 in American cinema